Made in YU, also known as Made in Yugoslavia, is a 2005 Swedish action drama film directed by Miko Lazić.

Plot
The story begins with a suicide attempt by Petar Petrović, a Serbian worker in Sweden. Peter plays the lottery for years and finally managed to win it and bought a house by the sea. Unfortunately, war broke out and his house was seized, as according to him, more than enough to convince him of suicide.

Mara, his wife, by all means tries to convince him of the crazy ideas from neighbors and also conceal the true state of affairs. Through a sequence in the film we learn that the first of Petrovic, Savo, came to Sweden and that his call came to Peter and Braco. Initially, their work provided the Savo and they paid him a commission, of course, reduced, however, because the brothers, but as the years passed, each started their work. Peter Mara opened the pizzeria, bakery Braco, while Savo left the shady dealings and often borrowed money from Peter to bring back the debts. Unlike Peter, Braco was not in the mood for a loan, because he thought that gave him enough and that he came back everything they owe.

Cast
Saša Drakulić as Mihaljo age 24
Slobodan Ninković as Petar
Dragan Jovanović as Braco
Milorad Mandić as Savo
Pavle Martinoski as Mihaljo age 16
Nataša Ninković as Maria
Marko Jeremić as Zoran
Velimir 'Bata' Živojinović as Farfar
Josif Tatić as Mate
Bogdan Diklić as Muharem
Lisa Lindgren as Gerd
Goran Marjanović as Milo
Georgi Staykov as Stevo
Per-Gunnar Hylén as Ingemar
Petar Božović as Krsto

References

Swedish drama films
Swedish action films
Serbo-Croatian-language films
Swedish-language films